This page is about the original student project, for the sequel see Octodad: Dadliest Catch.

Octodad is a freeware independent video game developed by a group of students at DePaul University, many of whom would go on to form Young Horses, Inc., the developers of its sequel Octodad: Dadliest Catch. The game was developed for the Student Showcase of the 2011 Independent Games Festival, and would go on to be one of 8 winners in the Student Showcase award of that year. The game features a humorous plot revolving around the central character, an octopus who is undercover as an average human with a family. The plot revolves around the player, controlling Octodad, attempting to complete various household chores and tasks while maintaining his secret.  The gameplay consists of primarily ragdoll physics, turning mundane tasks into significant challenges. Dadliest Catch was released on January 30, 2014, and was one of the first titles to be given the Steam Greenlight.

Synopsis

In Octodad, the player is in control of an octopus posing as a human man with a normal, human family. The gameplay largely revolves around the balance of keeping this charade alive while completing household chores, and evading his wife Scarlet's increasing suspicion of her husband's strange behavior.  The antagonist of the game is the manic Japanese chef Fujimoto, who obsessively seeks to expose the octopus' secret and cook him.  Fujimoto is the only character who sees through the protagonist's disguise from the beginning.

Gameplay
There are two different modes within Octodad the user can switch between in order to complete tasks. The first is default mode, used for moving the character throughout the game, mainly within the confines of the family house. All of his limbs are controlled independently, however, in "attack" mode, only the legs are available to the player.  To move the left and right 'leg' tentacles for walking, the player must press and hold the right mouse button and push the mouse forward and release when they want to put the mouse back down and take a step.

Plot

Living Room

Upon entering the living room a cut scene appears. It is his son who states that Octodad must get past a "gauntlet of awesome challenges", before his suit can be retrieved, to which Octodad reacts with relative uncaring. Jokingly, his son says that he could ground him, but that would make him a chicken. As even chickens have a spine, Tommy concludes that must make him an OCTOPUS, causing Octodad to take the matter at hand seriously and thus beginning the gameplay for this segment. Octodad has to knock down a tower of blocks, a simple act with the controls, and then score a goal into his son's "goal", which is really a cardboard box, this is a more challenging task, yet it is still manageable. The final challenge is a race around the living room, which given the control method is a lot more difficult.

Once all the objectives are complete Tommy graces his father with the key to the grandfather clock in which his suit is stored. Another cut scene appears showing Octodad watching TV. The advert on the television shows a fish restaurant called "Fujimoto". The head chef of this restaurant is crazed and his obsession is to kill, cook and eat Octodad. He then appears at Octodad's living room window and startles him, the screen inks black and the player is back to the game.

Kitchen

After entering the kitchen another cut scene follows. Octodad's wife arrives back from the store and on top of all her shopping is a banana. After asking for it she states "But yesterday you said bananas were demonspawn from your darkest nightmare." A thought bubble coming from Octodad's head then shows him slipping on a banana peel, explaining his hatred for them. She says he can have it and appears to hand him it then recoils at the last second stating he only gets it after he's finished all his kitchen chores. Now it's back in the kitchen and he has another four tasks to complete. These objectives are common household chores easily done by humans, but with Octodad and the control scheme used, it can be more problematic. The main tasks are to clear the red counter of anything left on it, putting dishes into the sink, and then clearing out the fridge, as well as mopping the floor. These can be more problematic than the previous tasks, although when clearing the fridge, all items in the fridge within it can be left on the floor and be considered completed. Once all the objectives are complete, your wife hands Octodad the banana and the player must exit the kitchen to progress to the next mission.

Kid's room

Upon entering the kid's room another cut scene follows. It shows his daughter, whom is frightened by the prospect of monsters in her room, provoked by her brother, Tommy. She says she cannot let go of her "octodoll" if she is scared so, Octodad, the loving father, sets out to banish her fears. One objective is to check the closet for monsters, which will reveal an actual monster was in the closet. Octodad has to stomp any spiders found in the bedroom, and also find a book to read for his daughter. Finally, as soon as she is asleep, Octodad has to find a substitute doll for his daughter, relying on the controls of the hands can be difficult here. Once the doll is retrieved, Octodad must escape her room quietly without waking her and return to the dining room to finally build the mannequin.

Once the mannequin is complete, a penultimate cut scene appears. The chef from Fujimoto bursts in the front door to the house and confronts him with a final challenge. Octodad must climb a ladder. The chef sets Octodad's dining room on fire and stands at the top of the ladder waiting for him. Once the ladder is climbed the final cut scene is shown.

The chef tries to kill Octodad and swings his meat cleaver and strikes the mannequin Octodad fashioned earlier. He realises he has been fooled but it is too late and Octodad's children appear. The chef claims that Octodad is not human but the children take no notice and are on Octodad's side. The chef is forcefully removed from the house by a barrage of toys. Now standing on the street in the light of a street lamp, the chef announces his revenge upon Octodad and his family and disappears using his 'Smoke bomb'.

Basement

Octodad is confronted by a stairway down to the basement, with banana peels blocking the way. The basement includes a shovel that Octodad picks up to dig for a key. Once found the said key, he puts it into the keyhole of the 'shield', opening up a secret passageway.

Secret Room
Octodad finds himself into a secret passageway, confronted by the Fujimoto Chef. When Octodad walks closer to the chef, the door to the chef closes. Octodad must pass a series of lasers. Then a zipline. Octodad is confronted by another series of lasers. Then, Octodad is confronted by a present, waiting for a bow to be put on it.

Development
The team behind the original Octodad consisted of eighteen students attending the DePaul University of Chicago, Illinois, eight of whom went to form Young Horses Inc, the team behind its sequel Dadliest Catch. Its origins have been described as "The idea was originally a joke, based on another idea that was a joke that came about through the frustration of us not being able to come up with something original" by programmer Phillip Tibitoski in an interview with video game website Joystiq. The initial idea was inspired by such movies as Men in Black and Being John Malkovich. The game Jurassic Park Trespasser served as an inspiration for the gameplay, particularly the controls. Developer Phil Tibotski stated of Trespasser's controls' "In that game it was meant to be this serious cool feature, but it ended up being this glitchy, disastrous, but hilarious, mess," Through Trespasser the team noted that they could make the game a comedy through the gameplay in addition to the premise itself.

During the development of the game, the controls schemes were a major issue of talking, with many various formats being considered, including the traditional WASD format, as well as the use of a secondary mouse, and thus it was settled for the current method that was described by Rob Lockhart as "the greatest source of novelty, as well as frustration".

In its current form, Young Horses Inc consists of eight of the original 18 developers, with those who are no longer partaking in development signing over rights to Octodad in return for a share of the company as well as royalties from the sequel.

Reception
Octodad was well received by critics and the public alike. It was praised for its comedy, as well as its interesting gameplay style. It received 3.5 out of 5 from the-back-row. Although it is known for being very difficult to play, the game designers are praised for keeping it short being able to complete in under an hour. Allen Cook from Gamers with Jobs described it as "the best slapstick routine I've seen in a game, period". However it did receive some criticism for not resolving some plot points such as the chef that threatens to cook the main character and appears in the family home. Overall, the game was cited as being very well written for a college project. It has also been compared to the game QWOP due to how both games feature awkward controls as a key feature of the game.

Sequel

Octodad: Dadliest Catch is the sequel to Octodad and one of the first games to be successfully greenlit via Steam. It was funded through Kickstarter, achieving a funding level of $24,320 and surpassing the developer's goal of $20,000, with funding ending in August 2011. The game was released for Microsoft Windows, Mac OS, and Linux on January 30, 2014, PlayStation 4 on April 22, 2014, PlayStation Vita on May 26, 2015,  Xbox One on August 25, 2015, Wii U and IOS on October 29, 2015,  Android on November 4, 2015 and Nintendo Switch on November 9, 2017. The game features improved graphics, and has a more expansive plot compared to the original. The sequel price at launch was US$14.99 on consoles and US$4.99 on mobile.

References

2010 video games
Adventure games
Anthropomorphic molluscs
Fictional octopuses
Freeware games
Indie video games
Linux games
MacOS games
Video games about animals
Windows games
Video games developed in the United States
Independent Games Festival winners